Mariana Martins (born 11 February 1983) is a Brazilian judoka. She competed in the women's extra-lightweight event at the 2000 Summer Olympics.

References

1983 births
Living people
Brazilian female judoka
Olympic judoka of Brazil
Judoka at the 2000 Summer Olympics
Place of birth missing (living people)